Mannheimer Fußballverein was an early German association football club, founded in 1898 in the city of Mannheim, Baden-Württemberg.

FV was one of five founding members of the Mannheimer Fußball-Bund established in 1899. The club went on to also become a founding member of the DFB (Deutscher Fußball Bund or German Football Association) at Leipzig in 1900.

Football clubs in Germany
Defunct football clubs in Germany
Defunct football clubs in Baden-Württemberg
Association football clubs established in 1899
Sport in Mannheim
1898 establishments in Germany